Lherz Massif is an upper mantle peridotite body in the French Pyrenees. The mineral lherzolite takes its name from this rock body.

References

Geology of France
Ophiolites
Pyrenees